From Cherry English is a Canadian short film, directed by Jeff Barnaby and released in 2004. Barnaby's first short film, it stars Nathaniel Arcand as Traylor, a Mi'kmaq man who is taken on a hallucinogenic journey by a mysterious woman, as an allegory for the threats to indigenous identity posed by modern life.

The film won two Golden Sheaf Awards at the 2004 Yorkton Film Festival, for Best Aboriginal and Best Videography. At the 2004 imagineNATIVE Film and Media Arts Festival, it received an honorable mention for the Cynthia Lickers-Sage Award for Emerging Talent.

References

External links
 

2004 short films
2000s science fiction films
Mi'kmaq-language films
Canadian science fiction short films
Films directed by Jeff Barnaby
2000s English-language films
2000s Canadian films